The Gamecocks' 1979 season was the program's second ever, and is noted for the new program reaching the NCAA Division I Men's Soccer Tournament for the first time.

The Gamecocks finished with their second consecutive winning record, at 14-5. They faced the Clemson Tigers in their first match of the 1979 tournament, losing 1–0 to the more established (eighth tournament) Clemson squad.

This season was also the last at Carolina for senior Brian Winstead, who would leave the school as the leading goal-scorer in school history (a title he would hold for seven years); and Paul Turin, a star goalkeeper who would go on to play for the Tulsa Roughnecks in the NASL.

Roster 
 David Burr
 Mike Devine
 Roy Dunshee
 David Goodchild
 Eric Hawkes
 Chris Heidelberger
 Thom Heath
 Jake Heilich
 Jim Heilich
 Wattie Langston
 Pat Layden
 Mike Mousaw
 Ed Muehlheausler
 John Murphy
 John Nitardy
 Dan Potter
 Tom Reilly
 Joel Schmiedeke
 Paul Stockwell
 John Tremeont
 Paul Turin
 Raymond Vigliotti
 Boo Westin
 David Whittington
 Brian Winstead
 Richard Wurdack

Results 

# Wheat Classic

See also 
 South Carolina Gamecocks

South Carolina Gamecocks men's soccer seasons
South Carolina Gamecocks
South Carolina Gamecocks
South Carolina Gamecocks, soccer men's
American soccer clubs 1979 season